This is a sub-article to Geography of Poland
The Sudetes and Carpathian Mountains mountain ranges are located on either side of Poland's southern border. Within Poland, neither of these ranges is forbidding enough to prevent substantial habitation; the Carpathians are especially densely populated. The rugged form of the Sudeten range derives from the geological shifts that formed the later Carpathian uplift. The Carpathians in Poland, formed as a discrete topographical unit in the relatively recent Tertiary Era, are the highest mountains in the country. They are the northernmost edge of a much larger range that extends into the Czech Republic, Slovakia, Ukraine, Hungary, and Romania.

The Świętokrzyskie Mountains, one of the oldest mountain ranges in Europe, are located in central Poland, in the vicinity of the city of Kielce. The mountain range consists of a number of separate ranges, the highest of which is Łysogóry (lit. bald mountains). Together with the Jura Krakowsko-Częstochowska the mountains form a region called the Lesser Poland Upland (Wyżyna Małopolska). They were formed during the Caledonian orogeny of the Silurian period and then rejuvenated in the Hercynian orogeny of the Upper Carboniferous period.

The most known and significant mountain in Poland are the Tatra Mountains which attract many tourists from Poland and its neighbouring states.

Polish mountain ranges

 Carpathian Mountains
 Tatra Mountains
 Pieniny
 Silesian Beskids
 Little Beskids
 Maków Beskids
 Żywiec Beskids
 Island Beskids
 Gorce Mountains
 Beskid Sądecki
 Low Beskids
 Bieszczady Mountains
 Otryt
 Sanocko-Turczańskie Mountains

 Sudetes
 Giant Mountains
 Śnieżnik Massif
 Jizera Mountains
 Golden Mountains
 Orlické hory
 Owl Mountains
 Bystrzyckie Mountains
 Rudawy Janowickie
 Stone Mountains
 Table Mountains
 Opawskie Mountains
 Wałbrzych Mountains
 Bardzkie Mountains
 Kaczawskie Mountains
 Ślęża Massif

List of Polish mountains

See also 
 Crown of Polish Mountains

References 
http://www.pieniny.com/uploaded/mapapienin.png

 
Poland
Mountains
Poland